Jinshan Township may refer to:

Republic of China (Taiwan)
Jinshan District, New Taipei, formerly Jinshan Township
Jinfeng, Taitung, Taiwan, a township that was formerly named Jinshan

Township name disambiguation pages